Marc Jean Chrétien Simenon, (19 April 1939 – 24 October 1999) was a French director and screenwriter. Born in Brussels, Belgium, he was the son of writer Georges Simenon (1903–1989) and the husband of Mylène Demongeot from 16 September 1968. He died falling down the stairs at his home in Paris.

Filmography

Film 
 1959: Le Déjeuner sur l'herbe by Jean Renoir
 1964: Le Gendarme de Saint-Tropez by Jean Girault
 1964: Les Gorilles de Jean Girault
 1965: Le Gendarme à New York by Jean Girault
 1970: Le Champignon
 1971: 
 1972: Douce est la revanche
 1974: 
 1977: La Moto qui tue (L’Échappatoire) by Claude Patin
 1981: Signé Furax

Television
 1968: Les Dossiers de l'agence O
 1980: Kick, Raoul, la moto, les jeunes et les autres
 1986: Le Petit docteur
 1992: Vacances au purgatoire
 1994–1995: Chien et chat
 1996: Chercheurs d'or
 1998: Micro climat

References

External links
 

French film directors
French television directors
French male screenwriters
20th-century French screenwriters
1939 births
1999 deaths
Mass media people from Brussels
20th-century French male writers